XHEPIC-FM is a radio station on 98.5 FM in Tepic, Nayarit. XHEPIC is owned by Grupo Radiorama and carries its @FM pop format.

History
XHEPIC began as XEPIC-AM 1380, made available in 1976 and finally awarded to Radiorama subsidiary Anahuac Radio, S.A., in 1996.

On August 12, 2019, Éxtasis Digital moved to sister station XHEOO-FM 96.1 and Arroba FM moved to XHEPIC 98.5.

References

Radio stations in Nayarit